Isaak Augustijn Rumpf (1673–1723) was a governor of Dutch Ceylon. He was appointed on 5 December 1716 and was Governor until 11 June 1723, when he died in office.

Family life
Rumpf (sometimes spelled Rumph) was the son of the diplomat Christiaan Constantijn Rumpf (1633, The Hague – 1706, Stockholm) and Elisabeth Pierrat de Longueville (1646–1675). He obtained a Doctor of Laws degree at Leiden University and left for the Indies early in 1707. En route, on 26 June 1707 in Cape Town, he married Gijsberta Joanna Blesius (born 1686, Cape Town). Isaak and Gijsberta had a daughter Susanna. Gijsberta remarried in 1726 as widow Rumpf with Mr. Everhard Kraayvanger of Macassar, Advocate Fiscaal of India.

References

1673 births
1723 deaths
18th-century Dutch people
Dutch expatriates in Sri Lanka
Governors of Dutch Ceylon
Leiden University alumni
People from The Hague